The Soboba Golf Classic was a golf tournament on the Web.com Tour. It was played at The Country Club at Soboba Springs, owned by the Soboba Band of Luiseno Indians, in San Jacinto, California. It was first played in 2009.

The purse in 2012 was $750,000 with $135,000 going to the winner.

Winners

Bolded golfers graduated to the PGA Tour via the Web.com Tour regular-season money list.

References

External links
The Country Club at Soboba Springs

Former Korn Ferry Tour events
Golf in California
Sports in Riverside County, California
Recurring sporting events established in 2009
Recurring sporting events disestablished in 2012
2009 establishments in California
2012 disestablishments in California